The 1976 Music City USA 420 was a NASCAR Winston Cup Series race that took place on May 8, 1976, at Nashville Speedway (now Fairgrounds Speedway) in Nashville, Tennessee.

The five drivers that dominated the 1976 NASCAR Winston Cup Series season were David Pearson (average finish of 7th place), Cale Yarborough (average finish of 8th place), Richard Petty (average finish of 9th place), Benny Parsons (average finish of 10th place), and Bobby Allison (average finish 12th place).

Background
Nashville Speedway was converted to a half-mile paved oval in 1957, when it began to be a NASCAR series track. The speedway was lengthened between the 1969 and 1970 seasons. The corners were cut down from 35 degrees to their present 18 degrees in 1972.

Race report
It took two hours and fifty-seven minutes for Cale Yarborough to defeat Richard Petty by 1.3 seconds in front of 16000 spectators. Five cautions slowed the race for 33 laps along with 16 changes in the lead.

Rick Newsom finished last due to an ignition problem on lap 22. All of the 30 drivers on the grid were American-born. The winner received $8,565 in winnings ($ when adjusted for inflation) while the last-place finisher would win $305 ($ when adjusted for inflation).

19-year-old Sterling Marlin made NASCAR debut in his race; he started in 30th place and finished in 29th place. Marlin filled in for his father Coo Coo while he was recovering from an injury.

Notable crew chiefs for this race were Billy Hagan, Harry Hyde, Jake Elder, Dale Inman, Bud Moore, Coo Coo Marlin, Tim Brewer and Travis Carter.

Qualifying

Finishing order

 Cale Yarborough (No. 11)
 Richard Petty (No. 43)
 Benny Parsons (No. 72)
 Buddy Baker (No. 15)
 Bobby Allison (No. 2)
 Lennie Pond (No. 54)
 Dave Marcis (No. 71)
 Walter Ballard (No. 30)
 David Sisco (No. 05)
 Frank Warren (No. 79)
 D.K. Ulrich (No. 40)
 Darrell Waltrip* (No. 88)
 Elmo Langley (No. 64)
 Cecil Gordon (No. 24)
 Jimmy Means (No. 52)
 Buck Baker (No. 33)
 Richard Childress* (No. 3)
 James Hylton* (No. 48)
 Ed Negre* (No. 8)
 J.D. McDuffie* (No. 70)
 Jabe Thomas* (No. 25)
 Skip Manning* (No. 92)
 Bruce Hill* (No. 47)
 Baxter Price* (No. 45)
 Henley Gray* (No. 19)
 Buddy Arrington* (No. 67)
 Gary Myers* (No. 95)
 Walter Wallace* (No. 87)
 Sterling Marlin* (No. 14)
 Rick Newsom* (No. 20)

* Driver failed to finish race

Timeline
Section reference: 
 Start: Cale Yarborough was leading the starting grid as the drivers crossed the start/finish line.
 Lap 39: Lennie Pond took over the lead from Cale Yarborough.
 Lap 40: Dave Marcis took over the lead from Lennie Pond.
 Lap 47: Cale Yarborough took over the lead from Dave Marcis.
 Lap 59: The rear end of Walter Wallace's vehicle came off in an unsafe manner.
 Lap 72: Buddy Arrington managed to overheat his vehicle.
 Lap 131: Baxter Price blew his engine while driving at high speeds.
 Lap 150: Benny Parsons took over the lead from Cale Yarborough.
 Lap 151: Richard Petty took over the lead from Benny Parsons.
 Lap 152: Cale Yarborough took over the lead from Richard Petty.
 Lap 161: Bobby Allison took over the lead from Cale Yarborough.
 Lap 162: Cale Yarborough took over the lead from Bobby Allison.
 Lap 167: Skip Manning blew his engine while driving at high speeds.
 Lap 171: Jabe Thomas blew his engine while driving at high speeds.
 Lap 180: Darrell Waltrip took over the lead from Cale Yarborough.
 Lap 185: Cale Yarborough took over the lead from Darrell Waltrip.
 Lap 227: Ed Negre managed to overheat his vehicle.
 Lap 256: James Hylton blew his engine while driving at high speeds.
 Lap 303: Benny Parsons took over the lead from Cale Yarborough.
 Lap 305: Cale Yarborough took over the lead from Benny Parsons.
 Lap 348: Benny Parsons took over the lead from Cale Yarborough.
 Lap 350: Darrell Waltrip took over the lead from Benny Parsons.
 Lap 352: Cale Yarborough took over the lead from Darrell Waltrip.
 Lap 393: The rear end came off of Darrell Waltrip's vehicle in an unsafe manner.
 Finish: Cale Yarborough was officially declared the winner of the event.

Standings after the race

References

Music City USA 420
NASCAR races at Fairgrounds Speedway
Music City USA 420
Music City USA 420